The 1930–31 Kansas Jayhawks men's basketball team represented the University of Kansas during the 1930–31 college men's basketball season.

Roster
Ralph Baker
Tom Bishop
Forrest Cox
William Johnson
Theodore O'Leary
Leland Page
Floyd Ramsey

Schedule

References

Kansas Jayhawks men's basketball seasons
Kansas
Kansas
Kansas